Élite 1 (since 2018, and previously Top 8 from 2015 to 2018) is the top national league for women's rugby union clubs in France. It was founded from the 1971–1972 season under the aegis of the French Women's Rugby Association before being taken over by the French Women's Rugby Federation, it has been organized by the French Rugby Federation since 1989. The first season was won by the ASVEL Rugby women's side. 

The championship takes place in two phases: a so-called qualification phase, which is contested by all the teams, and a final phase which is played by direct elimination. From 2015 to 2018, the championship is referred to as the Top 8. In 2018, the championship went from a single pool of 8 clubs to two pools of 16. The 8 best clubs qualified for the final phase. Since the 2018-2019 season, two clubs have been relegated to Elite 2 at the end of the championship.

As with men, the most successful club in France is Toulouse: it is Toulouse Fémina Sports , with 9 French championship titles, in 1975, 1976, 1977, 1978, 1979, 1980, 1982, 1984 and 1985. Montpellier RC is the second most successful team with eight titles (2007, 2010, 2013, 2014, 2015 , 2017 , 2018 and 2019). In a recent reform in 2021, the league has seen the number of teams decrease from 16 to 14 and there will only be 12 teams next season.

ASM Romagnat won the Élite 1 2020-2021 season.

Teams

Champions

References

External links
 Official site

 

France
Women
Women's rugby union competitions in France
Women's sports leagues in France
1971 establishments in France
Sports leagues established in 1971